Eric Jones (birth unknown – death unknown) was a professional rugby league footballer who played in the 1930s, 1940s and 1950s. He played at club level for Castleford (Heritage № 192), and Featherstone Rovers (Heritage № 292).

Playing career
Eric Jones made his début for the Featherstone Rovers on Saturday 9 October 1948, and he played his last match for the Featherstone Rovers during the 1949–50 season.

References

External links
Search for "Jones" at rugbyleagueproject.org
Eric Jones Memory Box Search at archive.castigersheritage.com

Castleford Tigers players
English rugby league players
Featherstone Rovers players
Place of birth missing
Place of death missing
Year of birth missing
Year of death missing